Allan E. Doucette (c. 1872 – January 8, 1901) was an All-American football player.  He played at the center position for Harvard University and was selected for the 1897 College Football All-America Team.  Doucette graduated from Harvard as an undergraduate in 1895. He spent the next three years at Harvard Law School, graduating in 1898.  He then went into the private practice of law.  In 1900, Doucette was stricken with typhoid fever.  After an illness of six months, he died at his home in Cambridge, Massachusetts, in January 1901.

References

1870s births
1901 deaths
19th-century players of American football
Harvard Crimson football players
All-American college football players
Harvard Law School alumni